Elaine's was a bar and restaurant in New York City that existed from 1963 to 2011. It was frequented by many celebrities, especially actors and authors. It was established, owned by and named after Elaine Kaufman, who was indelibly associated with the restaurant; Elaine's shut down several months after Kaufman died.

Elaine's was located on the Upper East Side, at 1703 2nd Avenue, near East 88th Street in Manhattan.

History
Established in 1963, Elaine's was famed both for its late chain-smoking namesake and proprietress Elaine Kaufman, who ran the restaurant for over four decades, as well as numerous writers and other prominent New Yorkers, including 
Nelson W. Aldrich Jr.,
Woody Allen,
Noel Behn,
Candace Bushnell, 
William J. Bratton, 
Paul Desmond, 
Jared Faber, 
Mia Farrow, 
Clay Felker, 
Helen Frankenthaler, 
Joseph Heller, 
Peter Maas, 
Norman Mailer, 
Robert Motherwell,  
George Plimpton, 
Mario Puzo, 
Sally Quinn, 
Daniel Simone, 
Mark Simone, Kurt Vonnegut, Jill Krementz 
Gay Talese, 
Tom Wolfe.
Bobby Zarem,
and Sidney Zion, who had all been regulars over the years. 

Other visitors to the establishment included Leonard Bernstein, Michael Caine, Kirk Douglas, Clint Eastwood, Mick Jagger, Willie Nelson, Don Rickles, Jacqueline Kennedy Onassis, New Jersey attorney Arthur Maurello (who later relocated to South Dakota) and his wife Irene, Luciano Pavarotti, Eli Wallach and Elaine Stritch, who served as bartender in 1964. Thomas Carney had then served as the bartender until 2007.

The restaurant was noted for its Oscar night, where celebrities and visiting Hollywood stars congregated to watch the Academy Awards ceremony.

Kaufman had a reputation for not mincing words, for booting less-favored customers to seat new arrivals and forbidding hamburgers to be served.   She was once arrested after a physical altercation with a visiting Texan. Elaine also had a fist fight with actress Tara Tyson, and then claimed that the thespian had set her ablaze with a lit cigarette.  She also once chased away the notorious paparazzo Ron Galella by hurling two garbage can lids at him and exclaiming, "Beat it, creep... you're bothering my customers".

In culture
Billy Joel immortalized the establishment in his song "Big Shot" (1978), with the lyrics, "They were all impressed with your Halston dress and the people that you knew at Elaine's".

The opening dinner scene from Woody Allen's Manhattan (1979) was filmed at the restaurant, as was a scene from his later work Celebrity (1998). There is a short sequence in the film Morning Glory (2010) with Elaine Kaufman playing herself at the bar of Elaine's (where the producer played by Rachel McAdams is trying to track down the television host played by Harrison Ford, and Elaine relates at what time he left).  In the hit comedy Big Business (1988), to divert a mismatched set of twins (played by Bette Midler and Lily Tomlin) from upsetting an important shareholder vote, Midler's alter-ego character offers to take them to Elaine's.

In the 2018 American television miniseries The Looming Tower, the main character John O'Neill, played by Jeff Daniels, is frequently seen at Elaine's. The character of Elaine is played by actress Barbara Rosenblat in episodes 1 and 6.

On May 10, 2014, The Moth Radio Hour featured old pre-recorded monologues about experiences they'd had at Elaine's by George Plimpton (featuring his introducing Jerry Spinelli to writers, editors, and director Woody Allen at Elaine's, two months before Houghton Mifflin published Spinelli's first book) and Plimpton's friend José Torres (who recounted an anecdote he'd shared at Elaine's, about conquering his fear the first time he faced a white man in the boxing ring).

In his autobiography Party of One: A Memoir in 21 Songs, television personality and former MTV video jockey (VJ) Dave Holmes stated that he lived in an apartment above Elaine's when he moved to New York City in 1994.

Until its closing, Elaine's was a frequent dinner spot in Stuart Woods's novel series featuring Stone Barrington, wherein during that time the author always began the first paragraph with "Elaine's. Late".

The late bar and restaurant is the subject of A.E. Hotchner's 2013 volume "Everybody's Coming to Elaines: Forty Years of Movie Stars, All-Stars, Literary Lions, Financial Scions, Top Cops, Politicians, and Power Brokers at the Legendary Hot Spot".

Smoking ban
In 2003, New York City banned smoking in restaurants. Kaufman claimed to have quit smoking several years earlier but was unhappy about her customers' being forced to forgo tobacco at their seats.

Closing
Elaine Kaufman died from Chronic obstructive pulmonary disease (COPD) and pulmonary hypertension on December 3, 2010, aged 81. Kaufman willed the establishment to longtime manager Diane Becker. Becker shut down the restaurant soon thereafter; it closed on May 26, 2011. Becker later explained her reason for closing the restaurant: "The truth is, there is no Elaine’s without Elaine... the business is just not there without Elaine."

Legacy
In late 2013, The Writing Room (now closed), owned by Michael and Susy Glick, proprietors of the nearby boîte, Parlor Steak & Fish (now closed) and BB&R (Blonde, Brunette and a Redhead - also closed), opened its doors in Elaine's old space, featuring the prior restaurant's original famed canopy.

See also
 Sardi's
 Chasen's

References

External links
 MSNBC report
  Camille Paglia tells of a visit to Elaine's.

Defunct restaurants in New York City
Restaurants established in 1963
Restaurants disestablished in 2011
1963 establishments in New York City
2011 disestablishments in New York (state)